Salvia clevelandii, the fragrant sage, blue sage, Jim sage and Cleveland sage, is a perennial plant that is native to Southern California and northern Baja California, growing below  elevation in California coastal sage and chaparral habitat. The plant was named in 1874 by Asa Gray, honoring plant collector Daniel Cleveland.

Description

Salvia clevelandii is an evergreen shrub that reaches  in height and width. Flowers are on  spikes, with numerous whorls of upright amethyst blooms opening in June–July.

Phytochemistry
The rose potpourri scented foliage of hybrids is composed of camphor and 1,8-cineole. Named cultivars with a eucalyptus scent also contain around 20% 1,8-cineole.

Taxonomy 
This species was described in 1874 as Audibertia clevelandii (the basionym) by Asa Gray, named in honor of Daniel Cleveland. Cleveland was an amateur botanist and civic leader from San Diego, who had taken an interest in the local flora and fauna, sending his collections to Gray over a 20-year correspondence.

In the wild, this species may hybridize with Salvia apiana and Salvia mellifera.

Distribution and habitat 
This species is found throughout portions of Southern California and northwestern Baja California, in chaparral and coastal sage scrub. It is distributed along the coast of San Diego County, the Peninsular Ranges of San Diego and Orange counties, and in northwestern Baja California, from the border to the northern portion of the Central Desert in the southern Sierra de San Pedro Martir.

Cultivation
Salvia clevelandii is a popular Southwest USA landscape plant, cultivated since the 1940s. Plants prefer dry summers, good drainage, and tolerate full sun in cooler areas. As a landscape plant they have a relatively short life span of five to ten years.

Cultivars and hybrids include:
'Winnifred Gilman', a popular cultivar with intense violet-blue flowers.
'Betsy Clebsch', a shorter cultivar with wide variation in flower color.
'Allen Chickering', 'Aromas', 'Pozo Blue', 'Santa Cruz Dark', and 'Whirly Blue' are hybrids with similar appearance.

Salvia clevelandii is one of the parents of the hybrid Salvia 'Celestial Blue'.

Notes

External links

 
 
 
 USDA Plants Profile: Salvia clevelandii
 Jepson Manual Treatment — Salvia clevelandii

clevelandii
Flora of California
Flora of Baja California
Natural history of the California chaparral and woodlands
Natural history of the Peninsular Ranges
Plants described in 1874
Taxa named by Asa Gray
Butterfly food plants
Garden plants of North America
Drought-tolerant plants
Flora without expected TNC conservation status